1 Paoni - Coptic calendar - 3 Paoni

Fixed commemorations
All fixed commemorations below are observed on 2 Paoni (9 June) by the Coptic Orthodox Church.

Saints
Pope John XVIII of Alexandria (1512 A.M.), (1796 A.D.)

Commemorations
Appearance of the Bodies of Saint John the Baptist and Prophet Elisha

References
Coptic Synexarion

Days of the Coptic calendar